Cristina Parodi (born 3 November 1964) is an Italian journalist and television host.

Biography
She debuted in the 80's in the small TV channels TelePiccolo and Telereporter and after in Odeon TV, hosting some sports shows like Caccia al 13 and Forza Italia.

In 1990 moved to Fininvest joining the sports news editor, presenting Calciomania with Maurizio Mosca, and working as correspondent in Pressing. From 1991, when started the Gulf War, she switched to the news entourage, and from autumn 1991 started presenting Canale 5 News, the first Canale 5's news program. From January 1992 she became, with the director Enrico Mentana, Lamberto Sposini and Cesara Buonamici, one of the most important TG5's anchorwoman.

In September 1996 has left TG5 and started presenting Verissimo, a daily afternoon show aired by Canale 5 which talked about gossip and cases of crime. In these years the program has been also promoted in primetime with a course titled Le storie di Verissimo. She presented this program, having a grateful success, until June 2005; in 2000 has hosted the entertainment primetime show Strano ma vero, with Gene Gnocchi, and in the summer of 2003 has presented the reality show The Bachelor - L'uomo dei sogni. She has also presented some TV events and various editions of Natale in Vaticano.

From September 2005 she came back presenting the main edition of TG5, on air at 8 p.m., and left hosting Verissimo.

She's the sister of another Italian journalist, Benedetta Parodi and a distant cousin of the Italian actress and television presenter Alba Parietti.

References

External links

Living people
1964 births
Università Cattolica del Sacro Cuore alumni
Italian television presenters
Italian television journalists
Italian women television presenters
Italian women journalists
People from Alessandria